Eugene Jantjies (born 10 August 1986 in Gobabis, South-West Africa) is a Namibian rugby union scrum-half, currently playing for the .

Club career

He played for Namibian side Western Suburbs from 2004 to 2007. He then moved to Farul Constanţa, in the Romanian Rugby Championship, where he played from 2008 to 2010, and once again from 2012 to 2014. He returned to Farul Constanţa for the 2013 and 2014 season before joining Dinamo București for 2015.

In 2016, he returned to Namibia to play for the Welwitschias in the 2016 Currie Cup First Division.

International career
Since his debut in 2006 against Kenya in Windhoek, Jantjies has played in 67 matches for Namibia, which is the overall national record for the most number of Test caps. He has scored four tries, 15 conversions, 8 penalties and one drop goal (77 points on aggregate).

He was called for the 2007 Rugby World Cup in France, playing in four games but without scoring. He was called once again for the 2011 Rugby World Cup in New Zealand, playing in four games and not scoring, and for the 2015 Rugby World Cup in England, where he played in three games and scored a try against Argentina.

His selection for the 2019 Rugby World Cup in Japan makes him the first Namibian to appear in four RWC tournaments.

Jantjies’s 50th Test match came off the bench during the 34-32 win against Spain during the 2016 World Rugby Nations Cup tournament in Bucharest.

External links

1986 births
Living people
CS Dinamo București (rugby union) players
People from Gobabis
Rugby union scrum-halves
Namibian rugby union players
Namibian expatriate rugby union players
Expatriate rugby union players in South Africa
Namibian expatriate sportspeople in South Africa
Expatriate rugby union players in Romania
Namibian expatriate sportspeople in Romania
Namibia international rugby union players
Leopards (rugby union) players
RCJ Farul Constanța players
București Wolves players
Welwitschias players